The Gesellschaft für Erdkunde zu Berlin (Berlin Geographical Society) was founded in 1828 and is the second oldest geographical society.

It was founded by some of the foremost geographers of its time. The founder Carl Ritter and the founding member Alexander von Humboldt can also be considered the founders of modern scientific geography.

Today the society's aim still is to promote the exchange and spreading of geographical knowledge.

The society publishes the scientific journal Die Erde (Earth) which has been published since 1853. It also sponsors young scientists with the Humboldt-Ritter-Penck-Preis.

External links
 Gesellschaft für Erdkunde zu Berlin website
 Some issues of Zeitschrift der Gesellschaft für Erdkunde zu Berlin fulltext via HathiTrust

Geographic societies
Organizations established in 1828
Non-profit organisations based in Berlin